When Duty Calls is a 20-episode Singaporean drama produced and telecast on Mediacorp Channel 8 in 2017. It is to commemorate 50 years of National Service in Singapore. It is sponsored by Ministry of Defence and Ministry of Home Affairs. It stars Desmond Tan, Romeo Tan, Pierre Png, Paige Chua and Felicia Chin as the main cast of the series with special appearance by Minister of Defence, Ng Eng Hen.

Casts

Main Casts

Supporting Casts

Guest appearances

Special appearances

Awards and nominations

Soundtrack

Development and production
Filming began in February 2017 and was completed in May. The series was filmed in collaboration with the Ministry of Defence (Mindef) and Ministry of Home Affairs (Home Team).

References

Singapore Chinese dramas
2017 Singaporean television series debuts
2018 Singaporean television series endings
Channel 8 (Singapore) original programming